Tizeng (also Romanized as Tīzeng; also known as Tīr Rīn and Tīr Zīn) is a village in Derakhtengan Rural District, in the Central District of Kerman County, Kerman Province, Iran. At the 2006 census, its population was 39, in 14 families.

References 

Populated places in Kerman County